Berdyansky Uyezd was one of the subdivisions of the Taurida Governorate of the Russian Empire. It was situated in the northeastern part of the governorate. Its administrative centre was Berdyansk.

Demographics
At the time of the Russian Empire Census of 1897, Berdyansky Uyezd had a population of 304,718. Of these, 58.8% spoke Ukrainian, 18.1% Russian, 10.4% Bulgarian, 7.8% German, 2.9% Yiddish, 0.5% Moldovan or Romanian, 0.4% Belarusian, 0.3% Tatar, 0.2% Greek, 0.1% Turkish, 0.1% Mordvin, 0.1% Polish, 0.1% Armenian and 0.1% Italian as their native language.

References

 
Uyezds of Taurida Governorate
Taurida Governorate